David Michael Richards (born 8 November 1931) is a former English cricketer.  Richards was a right-handed batsman who bowled right-arm fast-medium.  He was born at Bath, Somerset and educated at Cheltenham College.

Richards made his Minor Counties Championship debut for Wiltshire in 1949 against the Kent Second XI.  From 1949 to 1965, he represented the county in 34 Minor Counties Championship matches, the last of which came against Dorset.

Richards also represented Wiltshire in 2 List-A matches.  His debut List-A match came against Hampshire in the 1964 Gillette Cup.  His second and final List-A match came against Nottinghamshire in the 1965 Gillette Cup. In his 2 List-A matches, he scored 11 runs at a batting average of 5.50, with a high score of 11.  In the field he took a single catch.

References

External links
David Richards at Cricinfo
David Richards at CricketArchive

1931 births
Living people
Sportspeople from Bath, Somerset
Cricketers from Somerset
People educated at Cheltenham College
English cricketers
Wiltshire cricketers
Wiltshire cricket captains
Sportspeople from Gloucestershire